Scrubby may refer to:

Places
Scrubby Mountain, rural locality in Queensland
Scrubby Creek, locality in Blackall-Tambo Region, Queensland
Scrubby Creek, locality in Gympie Region, Queensland

See also
The Sheik of Scrubby Creek, country album of Chad Morgan